Kharzan may refer to:
 Kharzan, Isfahan (خارزن - Khārzan)
 Kharzan, Qazvin (خرزان - Kharzān)